Lars Gunnar Martin Frändesjö (born 18 July 1971) is a Swedish handball player who competed in the 1996 Summer Olympics and in the 2000 Summer Olympics.

He was born in Gothenburg.

In 1996 he was part of the Swedish handball team and won the silver medal in the Olympic tournament. He played one match and scored six goals. Four years later he was part of the Swedish team which won the silver medal again. He played five matches and scored 25 goals.

External links
profile

1971 births
Living people
Handball players from Gothenburg
Swedish male handball players
Olympic handball players of Sweden
Handball players at the 1996 Summer Olympics
Handball players at the 2000 Summer Olympics
Olympic silver medalists for Sweden
Swedish expatriate sportspeople in Denmark
Swedish expatriate sportspeople in France
Olympic medalists in handball
Medalists at the 2000 Summer Olympics
Medalists at the 1996 Summer Olympics
Redbergslids IK players